Cotys V (Ancient Greek: Κότυς) was a king of the Odrysian kingdom of Thrace from after ca. 120 BC, succeeding his possible father, Beithys.

References

See also 
List of Thracian tribes

 
2nd-century BC rulers in Europe
Thracian kings
Odrysian kings